Relator may refer to:

 Relator, a concept in group theory
 Relator (law)
 "Relator" (song)